Chromosome 1 is the designation for the largest human chromosome. Humans have two copies of chromosome 1, as they do with all of the autosomes, which are the non-sex chromosomes. Chromosome 1 spans about 249 million nucleotide base pairs, which are the basic units of information for DNA. It represents about 8% of the total DNA in human cells.

It was the last completed chromosome, sequenced two decades after the beginning of the Human Genome Project.

Genes

Number of genes
The following are some of the gene count estimates of human chromosome 1. Because researchers use different approaches to genome annotation their predictions of the number of genes on each chromosome varies (for technical details, see gene prediction). Among various projects, the collaborative consensus coding sequence project (CCDS) takes an extremely conservative strategy. So CCDS's gene number prediction represents a lower bound on the total number of human protein-coding genes.

Gene list 

The following is a partial list of genes on human chromosome 1. For complete list, see the link in the infobox on the right.
 C1orf112: encoding protein Chromosome 1 open reading frame 112
 C1orf127:  encoding protein Chromosome 1 open reading frame 127
 C1orf27: encoding protein Chromosome 1 open reading frame 27
 C1orf38: encoding protein Chromosome 1 open reading frame 38
 CCDC181: encoding protein Coiled-coil domain-containing protein 181
 DENN1B: hypothesized to be related to asthma
 FHAD1: encoding protein Forkhead-associated domain containing protein 1
 LOC100132287: uncharacterized protein
 LRRIQ3: encoding protein Leucine-rich repeats and IQ motif containing 3
 Shisa family member 4: encoding protein Shisa family member 4
 TINAGL1: encoding protein Tubulointerstitial nephritis antigen-like

p-arm
Partial list of the genes located on p-arm (short arm) of human chromosome 1:

q-arm
Partial list of the genes  located on q-arm (long arm) of human chromosome 1:

Diseases and disorders
There are 890 known diseases related to this chromosome. Some of these diseases are hearing loss, Alzheimer's disease, glaucoma and breast cancer. Rearrangements and mutations of chromosome 1 are prevalent in cancer and many other diseases. Patterns of sequence variation reveal signals of recent selection in specific genes that may contribute to human fitness, and also in regions where no function is evident.

Complete monosomy (only having one copy of the entire chromosome) is invariably lethal before birth.  Complete trisomy (having three copies of the entire chromosome) is lethal within days after conception.  Some partial deletions and partial duplications produce birth defects.

The following diseases are some of those related to genes on chromosome 1 (which contains the most known genetic diseases of any human chromosome):

 1q21.1 deletion syndrome
 1q21.1 duplication syndrome
 Alzheimer's disease
 Autosomal dominant Charcot-Marie-Tooth disease type 2 with giant axons
 Breast cancer
 Brooke Greenberg Disease (Syndrome X)
 Carnitine palmitoyltransferase II deficiency
 Charcot–Marie–Tooth disease, types 1 and 2
 collagenopathy, types II and XI
 congenital hypothyroidism
 Ehlers-Danlos syndrome
 Factor V Leiden thrombophilia
 Familial adenomatous polyposis
 galactosemia
 Gaucher disease
 Gaucher-like disease
 Gelatinous drop-like corneal dystrophy
 Glaucoma
 Hearing loss, autosomal recessive deafness 36
 Hemochromatosis
 Hepatoerythropoietic porphyria
 Homocystinuria
 Hutchinson Gilford progeria syndrome
 3-hydroxy-3-methylglutaryl-CoA lyase deficiency
 Hypertrophic cardiomyopathy, autosomal dominant mutations of TNNT2; hypertrophy usually mild; restrictive phenotype may be present; may carry high risk of sudden cardiac death
 maple syrup urine disease
 medium-chain acyl-coenzyme A dehydrogenase deficiency
 Microcephaly
 Muckle–Wells syndrome
 Nonsyndromic deafness
 Oligodendroglioma
 Parkinson disease
 Pheochromocytoma
 porphyria
 porphyria cutanea tarda
 popliteal pterygium syndrome
 prostate cancer
 Stickler syndrome
 TAR syndrome
 trimethylaminuria
 Usher syndrome
 Usher syndrome type II
 Van der Woude syndrome
 Variegate porphyria

Cytogenetic band

References

Further reading

External links

 
 
 

Chromosome 01